This list of Zeta Tau Alpha chapters includes the undergraduate and alumnae chapters of Zeta Tau Alpha women's fraternity. While given chapter names consisting of Greek letters,  sometimes refers to its chapters as "Links", referencing the Fraternity's "chain of links", a tradition where each installed member is represented on a silver chain link that is attached, in a line, to Alpha's original gold link.

Zeta Tau Alpha utilizes a links numbering convention parallel to the order it assigns names using the Greek alphabet. Beginning with the 26th link, when the Fraternity completed a round of Greek letters, its next class of links are granted the next Greek letter prefix, starting with Alpha (ex. Alpha Alpha, Alpha Beta, Alpha Gamma.) The prefix Epsilon was skipped as a class and as such, links installed after the Delta class were given the prefix Zeta instead. Occasionally, designations will reflect special circumstances surrounding the chapter's founding rather than the order of the Greek alphabet.  Today, new links are not given an official designation or a link number until they are installed; links being re-installed keep their original designation, regardless of when recolonization occurs. Note that a few names remained unassigned in previous decades.

Links
These are the links of Zeta Tau Alpha.  Active links are noted in bold and inactive links are noted in italics.

Notes

Alumnae chapters

References

External links
Zeta Tau Alpha collegiate  list

Lists of chapters of United States student societies by society
chapters